Jewish Center of Kings Highway is a historic synagogue at 1202–1218 Avenue P in Midwood, Brooklyn in New York City, USA. The synagogue was built between 1928 and 1930 and is a two-story-with-basement building faced in brick. It has a cast stone temple front with four engaged Corinthian order piers. Also on the property is a contributing school building built in 1949.

It was listed on the National Register of Historic Places in 2010.

References

Synagogues completed in 1930
Properties of religious function on the National Register of Historic Places in Brooklyn
Synagogues in Brooklyn
Synagogues on the National Register of Historic Places in New York City
Neoclassical synagogues
1930 establishments in New York City